Marbled carpet moth may refer to:

 Dysstroma truncata
 Dysstroma walkerata